Cheryl Maas (born 28 September 1984) is a Dutch snowboarder, who competed at the 2006 Winter Olympics in Torino, finishing 11th at the halfpipe. She also competed at the 2014 Winter Olympics in Sochi, finishing 20th in slopestyle and in the 2018 Winter Olympics in PyeongChang where she finished 23rd in slopestyle and 20th in big air.  She started snowboarding in 1993. In 2004, she played in the snowboard movie Dropstitch.

2016 Oslo 
Cheryl Maas took home a gold medal during the women’s big air event.

Winter X Games 13 
She had an accident in the Winter X Games 13 slopestyle track while training before the event.

Personal life 
Cheryl Maas lived in Oslo and is married to Natalie Hatfield from Boise, Idaho in February 2021. 
Cheryl has two daughters called Lara and Mila Kjeldaas, with her ex-wife Stine Brun Kjeldaas.
 After Maas qualified for the 2014 Winter Olympics, she criticized the International Olympic Committee for hosting the Olympics in gay-unfriendly Russia.

References

External links 
 
 
 
 
 Article about the problems with the Winter X Games 13 slopestyle track in aftenposten.no (norwegian)

1984 births
Living people
Dutch female snowboarders
Olympic snowboarders of the Netherlands
Snowboarders at the 2006 Winter Olympics
Snowboarders at the 2014 Winter Olympics
Snowboarders at the 2018 Winter Olympics
People from Uden
Lesbian sportswomen
LGBT snowboarders
Dutch LGBT sportspeople
21st-century LGBT people
Sportspeople from North Brabant